Megalopyge xanthopasa is a moth of the family Megalopygidae. It was described by Sepp in 1828. It is found in Suriname and French Guiana.

References

Moths described in 1828
Megalopygidae